Tetraethylammonium diiron oxyhexachloride is the chemical compound with the formula (N(C2H5)4)2Fe2OCl6.  It is the tetraethylammonium salt of [Fe2OCl6]2-.  Many related salts of [Fe2OCl6]2- are known.  The anion consists of a pair of tetrahedral Fe(III) centers that share a oxo bridging ligand. The salt can be prepared by treatment of tetraethylammonium tetrachloroferrate with sodium trimethylsiloxide.

References

Chlorides
Iron(III) compounds
Metal halides
Coordination complexes
Tetraethylammonium salts